The 2018 Christian Democratic Union leadership election took place during the party's 31st Congress in Hamburg at the Messehallen convention center on 7–8 December following Angela Merkel's decision in October 2018 not to stand for party leader at the 2018 party conference following the party's bad performance in the 2018 Hessian state election and the party's consistently low numbers in national polls.

In the subsequent party executive meeting on 29 October 2018, both the CDU's General Secretary Annegret Kramp-Karrenbauer and the Federal Minister of Health Jens Spahn announced their candidacy in the election. This was followed by Merkel's former arch-rival Friedrich Merz, who announced his bid and his return to politics on 30 October 2018. Spahn was eliminated after the first round, and Kramp-Karrenbauer subsequently won close-run second round of voting by 18 votes.

Candidates

Declared 
To be able to run as candidate for CDU leader, a person needs to be endorsed by a subdivision of the party (either the federal executive board or a state, district or local association) or the proposal by a delegate during the party convention.

Running 
The following people ran in the leadership election, having fulfilled the criteria to become a candidate in the convention.
 Annegret Kramp-Karrenbauer — General Secretary of the CDU (2018–today), Minister-President of Saarland (2011–2018), Leader of the CDU Saar (2011–2018), Minister for Family and Social Affairs in Saarland (2009–2011), Minister for Education in Saarland (2007–2009), Minister for the Interior in Saarland (2000–2007), Member of Landtag of Saarland (1999–2018), Member of Bundestag (1998). Kramp-Karrenbauer was endorsed by the Saarland state association of the CDU.
 Friedrich Merz — Leader of the Opposition and Parliamentary Leader of the CDU (2000–2002), Member of Bundestag (1994–2009), Member of the European Parliament (1989–1994). Merz was endorsed by the local associations of Fulda and of Hochsauerland.
 Jens Spahn — Minister for Health (2018–today), Parliamentary Secretary of State for Finance (2015–2018), Member of Bundestag (2002–present). Spahn was endorsed by the local association of Borken.

Announced 
The following CDU politicians announced their intention to run for CDU leadership, but did not receive an endorsement by either a subdivision or a delegate.
 Jan-Philipp Knoop – commissioner for Social-Media in Tempelhof-Schöneberg
 Detlef Felix Hartmann – Candidate for the Leadership of the CDU Hamburg
 Jörg Paulusch – City councillor of 
 Friedhelm Kölsch – Lord mayor candidate in Essen
 Andreas Ritzenhoff
 Norbert Stegner
 Christian Fleisinger
 Sabine Herrenbruch

Withdrew 
The following politicians intended to run for the office, but withdrew their candidacy.
  — Member of the Scientific Advisory Council on Biodiversity and Genetic Resources of the Federal Ministry of Food and Agriculture and Member of the Sixth Advisory Council of the Federal Academy for Security Policy
 Angela Merkel — Chancellor (2005–today), Leader of the Opposition (2002–2005), CDU Leader (2000–today), General Secretary of the CDU (1998–2000),  Federal Minister for Environment (1994–1998), Federal Minister for Youth and Women (1991–1994), Member of Bundestag (1990–today)

Declined 
 Daniel Günther — Minister-President of Schleswig-Holstein (2017–today), Leader of the CDU Schleswig-Holstein (2016–today), Member of Landtag of Schleswig-Holstein (2009–today)
 Armin Laschet — Minister-President of North Rhine-Westfalia (2017–today), Deputy Leader of the CDU (2012–today), Leader of the CDU North Rhine-Westfalia (2012–today), Opposition Leader in North Rhine-Westfalia (2010–2017), Member of Landtag of North Rhine-Westfalia (2010–today), Minister for Social Affairs in North-Rhine Westfalia (2005–2010), Member of European Parliament (1999–2005), Member of Bundestag (1994–1999)
 Ursula von der Leyen — Minister for Defence (2013–today), Deputy Leader of the CDU (2009–today), Minister for Social Affairs (2009–2013), Member of Bundestag (2009–today), Minister for Family (2005–2009), Minister for Social Affairs in Lower Saxony (2003–2005), Member of Landtag of Lower Saxony (2003–2005)
 Julia Klöckner — Minister of Food and Agriculture (2018–today), candidate for Minister-President of Rhineland-Palatinate in 2016 and 2011, Deputy Leader of the CDU (2012–today), Opposition Leader in Rhineland-Palatinate (2011–2018), Member of Landtag of Rhineland-Palatinate (2011–2018), Leader of the CDU Rhineland-Palatinate (2010–today), Member of Bundestag (2002–2011)
 Wolfgang Schäuble — President of Bundestag (2017–today), Minister for Finances (2009–2017), Minister of the Interior (2005–2009, 1989–1991), Leader of the CDU (1998–2000), Parliamentary Leader of the CDU (1991–2000), Chief of the Chancellery (1984–1989), Member of Bundestag (1972–today)

Endorsements

Opinion polling 

Among Delegates

Only Union/CDU Voters

Results

References

2018 elections in Germany
2010s in Hamburg
2018 in Germany
Leadership election, 2018
December 2018 events in Germany
Political party leadership elections in Germany
Christian Democratic Union of Germany leadership election